Nogometni klub Široki Brijeg is a professional football club based in Široki Brijeg, Bosnia and Herzegovina, which plays in the Premier League of Bosnia and Herzegovina. This chronological list comprises all those who have held the position of club manager since the club's formation in 1948.

In Široki Brijeg's history, 40 managers have so far managed the club, with some doing so on more than one occasion and two of them acting as only interim managers. The club's first manager was Luka Ljubičić, who managed the club from 1948 until 1949. The club's longest serving manager was Tomo Knezović, who led the team from 1962 to 1968. The current club manager is Ivica Barbarić.

Managerial history
The following is the full list of Široki Brijeg managers and their respective time on that position:

Notes

References

External links
Official Website 
NK Široki Brijeg at UEFA

Manager
Široki Brijeg
NK Sir
Lists of Bosnia and Herzegovina sportspeople